Chanoclavine II is an ergoline compound produced by certain fungi.

See also
 Chanoclavine

References

Ergolines